Lisa Fowler is an EastEnders character.

Lisa Fowler may also refer to:

Lisa Fowler (Youtube), beauty and style adviser
Lisa Fowler (True Blood)